The 2017 Purdue Boilermakers football team represented Purdue University in the 2017 NCAA Division I FBS football season. The Boilermakers competed as members of the West Division of the Big Ten Conference and played their home games at Ross–Ade Stadium in West Lafayette, Indiana. They were led by first-year head coach Jeff Brohm. They finished the season 7–6, 4–5 in Big Ten play to finish in a tie for third place in the West Division. They received a bid to the Foster Farms Bowl, their first bowl game since 2012, where they beat Arizona.

Previous season
The Boilermakers finished the 2016 season 3–9, 1–8 in Big Ten play to finish in last place in the West Division and failing to qualify for a bowl game for the fourth straight season.

On October 16, 2016, Darrell Hazell was fired with a 3–3 mid-season record. Gerad Parker was named the interim head coach for the remainder of the season, going 0–6. On December 5, 2016, just nine days after the season ended, Purdue hired Brohm to be the head coach of the football team. Brohm had been the head coach at Western Kentucky the previous three seasons.

Offseason 
On December 8, 2016, Brohm made his first official hire with JaMarcus Shephard joining the Purdue staff after serving as the Wide Receivers coach at Washington State in 2016. Shepard had worked with Brohm at Western Kentucky the 3 seasons prior to 2016. On December 31, 2016, Brohm hired Tony Levine to be Purdue's co-offensive coordinator, special teams coordinator and tight ends coach, the same jobs he had held under Brohm at Western Kentucky. On January 2, 2017, Brohm announced that he had hired, Brian Brohm, Nick Holt, Reggie Johnson, Anthony Poindexter and Dale Williams as assistant coaches.

Spring Game
The 2017 Purdue Spring Game took place in West Lafayette, Indiana at 1:00pm on April 8, 2017.

Recruiting

Position key

Recruits

Purdue's recruiting class consisted of 24 recruits, including six that enrolled early. Purdue's recruiting class was ranked 77th by Scout, 68th by Rivals, 71st by 247Sports.com, and 59th by ESPN.

Schedule and results

Radio
Radio coverage for all games will be broadcast statewide on The Purdue Sports Network and on Sirius XM Satellite Radio. The radio announcers are Tim Newton with play-by-play, Pete Quinn with color commentary, and Kelly Kitchel with sideline reports.

Game summaries

vs. Louisville

 Sources:

    
    
    
    
    
    
    
    
    
    

To open the season, Purdue met No. 16–ranked Louisville Cardinals in a neutral-site game at Lucas Oil Stadium in Indianapolis, Indiana. The gamed first time the two teams had met in 30 years, with the 1987 game ending in a 22–22 tie. The game was Jeff Brohm's first game as the head coach as he faced his alma mater.

Purdue opened the scoring in the first quarter with a 26-yard touchdown pass from Elijah Sindelar to Jackson Anthrop. Louisville tied the game at seven with a three-yard Lamar Jackson pass to Jordan Smith, and took the lead with a 23-yard field goal by Blanton Creque. Trailing 10–7, Purdue scored again on an eight-yard David Blough pass to Richie Worship to give the Boilermakers a surprising 14–10 lead into halftime. Louisville opened up the second half scoring with a 32-yard field goal to tighten the deficit to 14–13. Purdue responded on the following drive with a Brycen Hopkins touchdown pass from Blough to give Purdue a 21–13 lead. Louisville scored on the ensuing drive with a 10-yard Reggie Bonnafon touchdown run, but the Cardinals' two-point conversion failed. Trying to respond to the Louisville touchdown, Blough was intercepted by Stacy Thomas, who returned Blough's pass 61 yards for a touchdown, but again their two-point conversion failed, giving the Cardinals a 25–21 lead. Purdue would answer however with Sindelar at QB as he threw another touchdown to Anthrop, this time from 14 yards out. With Purdue back in front 28–25 and just a little over a minute later, Louisville answered with a 20-yard Dez Fitzpatrick touchdown reception from Jackson to give the Cardinals a 32–28 lead with nine minutes remaining. Louisville concluded the scoring with a 30-yard Creque field goal with a little over four minutes remaining in the game. Purdue could not answer and fell 35–28. The loss left the Boilermakers at 0–1 on the season.

vs. Ohio

 Sources:

    
    
    
    
    
    
    
    
    
    

After its game against Louisville, Purdue returned home for its first home game of the season against the Ohio Bobcats on a Friday night. It marked the first meeting of the two teams since 1988. The game also marked Purdue's first home night game as new permanent lights had been installed.

Purdue opened the scoring with a 36-yard Spencer Evans field goal. Purdue increased their lead when Elijah Sindelar found Brycen Hopkins for a 17-yard touchdown pass. Ohio responded with a 4-yard A. J. Ouellette rushing touchdown to close out the first quarter scoring. David Blough again took over for Sindelar at quarterback and played well going on a 24–0 run in the second quarter to take a 34–7 lead at halftime. Purdue's scores during the run included a Tario Fuller rushing touchdown, a Cole Herdman reception, a J. D. Dellinger field goal and Anthony Mahoungou touchdown. Blough completed six of seven attempts for 172 yards and two touchdowns in the second quarter. Ohio opened the second half scoring with a 1-yard Julian Ross touchdown. Blough added a five-yard touchdown pass to Jackson Anthrop to complete the third quarter scoring. Purdue extended the lead with a 38-yard Spencer Evans field goal. Ohio concluded the scoring with a 25-yard touchdown reception by Cameron Odom from Nathan Rourke. Blough finished 11 for 13 with three touchdowns. Despite Blough's performance, Jeff Brohm said he would still continue to use both Blough and Sindelar. Tario Fuller rushed for 142 yards on 16 attempts and recorded his first career touchdown for the Boilers in the blowout. Purdue gained 558 yards on the night while limiting the Bobcats to 396 yards. The win was Jeff Brohm's first as Purdue's head coach and moved the Boilers to 1–1 on the season.

at Missouri

 Sources:

    
    
    
    
    

After playing Ohio, Purdue traveled to Columbia, Missouri, to face the Missouri Tigers. This was the first meeting between the teams since the 1980 Liberty Bowl.

David Blough started his first game of the season for Purdue as they jumped out early and often against the Tigers, scoring touchdowns on their first three possessions as Blough ran for a 5-yard score, Tario Fuller scored on a 36-yard run and Richie Worship scored on a three-yard run that has the Boilermakers up 21–0 early in the first quarter. After Blough struggled to score in the second quarter, he was replaced by Elijah Sindelar who would find Jackson Anthrop on a five-yard pass to give the Boilermakers a 28-point lead with 2:20 left in the first half. The Tigers managed a field goal as the half ended with Purdue up 28–3. Another Blough touchdown pass from one yard out to Worship ended the scoring in the third quarter and gave Purdue an easy 35–3 win and moved them to 2–1 on the season. The 3 points given up by Purdue were the fewest since a September 17, 2011 shutout of Southeast Missouri State.

vs. Michigan

 Sources:

    
    
    
    
    

Following its game against Missouri, Purdue began its conference schedule when the No. 8–ranked Michigan Wolverines traveled to West Lafayette, Indiana, in Purdue's homecoming game. It was the first time the two have met since Michigan defeated Purdue, 44–13, on October 6, 2012.

Michigan defeated Purdue 28–10. After neither team scored in the first quarter, Michigan opened the scoring in the second quarter via a 12-yard touchdown pass from John O'Korn to Zach Gentry. Purdue responded with a 10-yard touchdown pass from Elijah Sindelar to Brycen Hopkins. Purdue then took their first lead of the game via a 29-yard field goal from J. D. Dellinger, which made the score 10–7 in favor of Purdue at half-time. Michigan then scored 21 unanswered points in the second half, via a 10-yard touchdown run from Chris Evans, a one-yard touchdown run from Ty Isaac, and a 49-yard touchdown run from Evans.

Michigan's defense held Purdue to 0-for-12 on third-down conversions, as Purdue did not convert a first down in the second half. Purdue was held to only 10 total yards in the second half.

vs. Minnesota

 Sources:

    
    
    
    
    
    
    

After a bye week following the Michigan game, Purdue hosted the Minnesota Golden Gophers. In the previous meeting (in 2016), Minnesota defeated Purdue, 44–31. During the ensuing week before the game, Purdue lost their all-time winningest coach Joe Tiller who died at the age of 76. Both teams wore helmet decals to remembrance of Tiller.

Purdue entered the game with leading rusher Tario Fuller missing the game with an injury, as well as defensive starters Ja'Whaun Bentley and Jacob Thieneman disqualified for the first half after being ejected during the Michigan game for targeting penalties. David Blough made his third consecutive start at quarterback and found Cole Herdman on the Boilermakers first drive, but the PAT was missed by Spencer Evans. Minnesota was able to take a comfortable lead when the intercepted Blough on consecutive possessions scoring a touchdown on each with Conor Rhoda throwing passes to Tyler Johnson and Brandon Lingen. Minnesota took a 14–6 lead into halftime. Purdue opened the second half scoring with a 22-yard D. J. Knox touchdown reception from Elijah Sindelar. Purdue took the lead with 9:58 left to play on a 19-yard J. D. Dellinger field goal. Immediately following the go ahead field goal, the game went into a weather delay because of lightning in the area. After an hour and a half rain delay, play resumed and Minnesota regained the lead with 2:26 left to play on a 38-yard Emmit Carpenter field goal. Purdue scored quickly on the next possession with a 12-yard Markell Jones touchdown run. Minnesota began driving with Rhoda finding Lingen and Rashad Still for catches of 7 and 32-yards respectively. Rhoda was then intercepted by Bentley who returned the ball 76-yards for a touchdown with 10 seconds remaining.

The win was Purdue's first Big Ten Conference home victory since 2015 and Coach Brohm's first Big Ten Conference victory.

at Wisconsin

 Sources:

    
    
    
    
    

Following its game against Minnesota, Purdue played its second road game against the No. 7–ranked Wisconsin Badgers. Wisconsin defeated the Boilermakers in a showdown during the prior meeting, winning 49–20.

Purdue changed their starting quarterback, going with Sindelar for the third time this season. Wisconsin opened the scoring with a 67-yard touchdown run by Jonathan Taylor. Following a 3 and out by the Purdue offense, Wisconsin extended their lead with a 14-yard Quintez Cephus touchdown reception from Alex Hornibrook. Purdue was able to score before the first quarter ended with a 36-yard Evans field goal. On Wisconsin's next drive Da'Wan Hunte intercepted Hornibrook's pass but Dellinger missed a field goal to cut into Purdue's deficit. Wisconsin was then able to drive into Purdue territory for a 46-yard Rafael Gaglianone field goal. Purdue then drove, which was aided by a T. J. Edwards targeting penalty and ejection, to score on a 49-yard Evans field goal as the first half expired. After a punt by Purdue started the second half, Danny Ezechukwu intercepted a Hornibrook screen pass leading to a 40-yard Dellinger field goal. On Wisconsin's next drive, Lorenzo Neal Jr. stripped Taylor in the red zone to give Purdue a chance to tie, but Purdue was forced to punt. After the ball was returned to Purdue on a punt, Purdue began to drive and was within field goal range when Sindelar was intercepted by Leon Jacobs with 8:14 left to play. Wisconsin was able to bleed out the rest of the half to hold onto a victory.

The victory was Wisconsin's 12th consecutive victory over Purdue.

at Rutgers

 Sources:

    
    
    
    

Following its game at Wisconsin, Purdue traveled to Piscataway, New Jersey to face the Rutgers Scarlet Knights. This was the first ever meeting between the two teams.

After forcing a Purdue punt, on their second play from scrimmage, Gus Edwards broke an inside handoff for a 74-yard touchdown run. After two exchanges of punts by both teams, Purdue finally scored on their fourth drive of the game with a 26-yard Spencer Evans field goal. Purdue would end their next four possessions on downs, a punt, an interception and the end of the half. Rutgers would hold on to their 7–3 lead going into the half. On the second possession of the second half for Rutgers, the offense picked up and Giovanni Rescigno found Raheem Blackshear on a wheel route and Blackshear shook Navon Mosely to increase the Scarlet Knights' lead to 14–3. Purdue responded on the following drive with a 24-yard J. D. Dellinger field goal. After another exchanging of punts, Purdue was stopped on 4th down on the Rutgers' 30-yard line instead of kicking a field goal. With Sindelar throwing a second interception, Purdue turned to Blough who lead Purdue to a 70-yard scoring drive capped with a 10-yard Anthony Mahoungou touchdown reception, but Blough's two-point attempt was dropped in the endzone, sealing the Scarlet Knights victory.

Nebraska

After facing Wisconsin, Purdue returned home and host its in-division rival, the Nebraska Cornhuskers. The previous year, Nebraska defeated Purdue 27–14.

Nebraska opened the scoring with a 44-yard Drew Brown field goal in the first quarter. Purdue took the lead after a 4-yard Richie Worship touchdown to open scoring in the second quarter. Brown and the Cornhuskers scored again with a 21-yard field goal. After an exchanging of punts, Purdue drove 86 yards in 3:52 ending with a 5-yard David Blough rush with 24 seconds remaining in the half. Nebraska scored first in the second half on a 37-yard field goal. Purdue responded on their next drive with a Spencer Evans field goal. On the ensuing drive, Brown added another field goal, cutting Purdue's lead to 5. Jackson Anthrop scored on a 14-yard pass from Blough on their next drive, increasing their lead to 12. Nebraska responded with a Tanner Lee touchdown pass to Tyler Hoppes from 27 yards out. After another series of punts from both teams, Purdue stopped Nebraska on downs with 3:44 left in the 4th quarter. Purdue then obtained a first down on two runs by D. J. Knox. Purdue was stopped on their next three downs, with a timeout coming from Nebraska after each of the first two and another by Purdue just before the play clock expired. Nebraska took over with 1:22 left on the clock with zero timeouts. Lee completed passes of 7, 17, 11 and 6–yards with Nebraska getting out of bounds of each of the plays. Purdue tackled J. D. Spielman in bounds, and after a rushed snap and play call, Lee threw his first completion of the drive to stop the clock, setting up 3rd and 4. On the next play, Lee found Stanley Morgan Jr. from 13 yards out for a touchdown with just 0:14 remaining. The two-point conversion failed. Purdue then found Anthony Mahoungou for a first down and called timeout. Now 69 yards away from a touchdown, Blough found Knox for 25 yards, who stepped out of bounds after the game clock had expired.

vs. Illinois

 Sources:

    
    
    
    
    
    
    

After facing Nebraska, Purdue hosted its rival, the Illinois Fighting Illini. The previous year, Purdue defeated Illinois 34–31 in overtime to win the Purdue Cannon, and kept the trophy by again defeating Illinois 29–10.

at Northwestern

 Sources:

    
    
    
    
    
    

After hosting Illinois, Purdue traveled to Evanston, Illinois, to face the Northwestern Wildcats. In the 2016 match-up, Purdue was defeated 45–17 by the Wildcats. and lost a much closer contest 23–13.

at Iowa

 Sources:

    
    
    
    
    
    

Following its game against Northwestern, Purdue played its final road game against Iowa Hawkeyes. Iowa had defeated the Boilermakers in a showdown the previous season, but Purdue shocked the Hawkeyes winning 24–15.

Indiana

 Sources:

    
    
    
    
    
    
    
    

Following its road finale against Iowa, Purdue faced its arch-rivals, the Indiana Hoosiers, in the 120th meeting of the "Old Oaken Bucket". This game marked the first time in the history of the rivalry that both teams played each other with the winner becoming bowl eligible. Purdue triumphed in an exciting game 31–24.

Foster Farms Bowl (vs. Arizona)

Roster

Statistics

Team

Scores by quarter

Offense

Rushing

Passing

Receiving

Defense

Special teams

All statistics

Awards and honors

Preseason awards / Watch list

Players in the 2018 NFL Draft

References

Purdue
Purdue Boilermakers football seasons
Redbox Bowl champion seasons
Purdue Boilermakers football